Hornøya is the northernmost island in Tribotnane, part of Thousand Islands, an archipelago south of Edgeøya. Its name refers to the neighboring Lurøya.

References

 Norwegian Polar Institute Place Names of Svalbard Database

Islands of Svalbard